Lecithocera pseudolunata is a moth in the family Lecithoceridae first described by Kyu-Tek Park in 2012. It is found in Indonesia (Irian Jaya) and Papua New Guinea.

Etymology
The species name refers to the resemblance to Lecithocera sublunata.

References

Moths described in 2012
pseudolunata